Guilherme Sarti Clezar (pronounced Clézar; born 31 December 1992), is a professional tennis player from Brazil. He played in several ATP 250 events, including the 2011 Brasil Open. Clezar plays mainly in ATP Challenger Tour events.

Career finals

Singles: 7 (2–5)

References

External links

Living people
1992 births
Brazilian male tennis players
South American Games bronze medalists for Brazil
South American Games medalists in tennis
Competitors at the 2010 South American Games
Sportspeople from Porto Alegre
20th-century Brazilian people
21st-century Brazilian people